The New Mutants are a group of fictional mutant superheroes appearing in American comic books published by Marvel Comics, generally in association with the X-Men. Originally depicted as the teenaged junior class at the Xavier Institute, subsequent stories have depicted the characters as adult superheroes (in their eponymous series as well as in related titles such as X-Force and The Avengers) or as teachers and mentors to younger mutants.

The team first appeared in  The New Mutants (September 1982) by Chris Claremont and artist Bob McLeod, part of the Marvel Graphic Novel line, followed by an ongoing series which ran from 1983 until 1991. Like the X-Men parent title, also written by Claremont, The New Mutants featured an ensemble cast, with stories often focused on interpersonal relationships and coming-of-age arcs, blending teen drama with action and adventure. The title was later taken over by writer Louise Simonson, ultimately taking a more action-oriented focus under artist Rob Liefeld, who relaunched the characters as X-Force following the series' end.

Since their inception, several New Mutants series have been published, either focusing on the continuing adventures of the original lineup, new groups of young mutants, or some combination of both. Individual characters have appeared in various film, television, and other media adaptations of the X-Men franchise, while most of the original lineup of the New Mutants was featured in the 2020 20th Century Studios horror film of the same name.

Original run 
By the early 1980s, Uncanny X-Men (under the authorship of Chris Claremont) had become one of the comic book industry's most successful titles, prompting Marvel editor-in-chief Jim Shooter to launch The New Mutants, the first of several X-Men spin-offs. X-Men editor Louise Simonson recalled "Neither Chris [Claremont] or I really wanted to do it. We wanted X-Men to be special and by itself, but Shooter told us that if we didn't come up with a new 'mutant' book, someone else would." The name was a modification of Stan Lee's original name for the X-Men, "The Mutants". The series was primarily written by Chris Claremont (#1-54, 63, 81, Annual 1-3) and Louise Simonson (#55-80, 82-91, 93-97, Annual 4-6), with Rob Liefeld plotting the final issues (#98-100) with writer Fabian Nicieza. The only issue written by a fill-in was #92, written by Dwight Zimmerman.

The New Mutants were teenaged students of Professor Charles Xavier's School for Gifted Youngsters and wore matching uniforms, much like the original X-Men, who had since grown into adulthood. These students resembled the "all-new, all-different X-Men" of their era in terms of ethnic diversity. Reflecting later on his run on the title, Claremont spoke about the appeal of stories focused on this younger cast: "The X-Men are fun but they’re grown-ups. They’re already set. The kids are the fungible ones. They’re making mistakes and they don’t know quite what they’re doing. This adventure might lead them to Asgard, the next one might lead them to someone committing suicide. It’s like seeing the evolution of Prince Hal through Henry IV 1 & 2, leading up to Henry V. It’s about growing and learning and taking responsibility."

The original team consisted of:

 Cannonball (Samuel Guthrie), a 16-year-old boy from Kentucky, United States and eventual co-leader, with the ability to generate thermo-chemical energy and propel himself through the air.
 Karma (Mạnh Cao Xuân), a 19-year-old girl from Vietnam and the team's original leader, who could mentally possess other people's bodies.
 Mirage (Danielle Moonstar, originally codenamed Psyche), a girl who is a Cheyenne Native American and eventual co-leader after Karma's apparent death, who could create visual empathic three-dimensional illusions.
 Sunspot (Roberto da Costa), a 14-year-old boy from Brazil who had superhuman strength fueled by sunlight and could store solar energy in his body to use his super strength.
 Wolfsbane (Rahne Sinclair), a 13-year-old religious girl from Scotland, United Kingdom who could transform into a wolf and a werewolf-like creature.

The team was intended to debut in their own series. As the first issue was nearing completion, Shooter ordered it to be reworked into a graphic novel so that Marvel Graphic Novel could make its deadline for the next issue. Thus, the New Mutants debuted in Marvel Graphic Novel #4 (December 1982), which continued a plotline from Uncanny X-Men. (Despite this, the graphic novel missed its shipping slot by two weeks due to artist Bob McLeod's honeymoon.)

The series was originally written by Claremont and illustrated by McLeod, the team's co-creators, but McLeod soon passed artistic duties on to Sal Buscema. McLeod was unprepared for the demands of doing both pencils and inks on a monthly book, prompting him to have Buscema do the breakdowns after the first three issues, and left entirely after issue #8 when he began to lose interest in the stories. Claremont gave the series a darker tone, which was heightened with the arrival of artist Bill Sienkiewicz. Sienkiewicz's avant garde art style and painted covers broke through the conventional comic book boundaries of the day and helped The New Mutants stand out on the shelf.

In addition to very serious depictions of teenage angst and growing pains, the series featured themes of mysticism. The stories also relied on wilder, more far-fetched premises than were typical of X-Men at the time, shaping into more of a science fiction and fantasy series than the superhero coming-of-age comic it had been touted as in its early days. Locales included demonic dimensions, alternate futures, and an ancient Roman civilization hidden within the Amazon rainforest. The New Mutants also encountered a secret society called the Hellfire Club, and began a rivalry with their young apprentices, the Hellions.

After the apparent death of Karma, Cannonball and Dani Moonstar act as co-leaders. New recruits included:

 Cypher (Douglas Ramsey), an otherwise ordinary young man who could learn to read or speak any language rapidly, whether it was human, alien, or machine, making him an unmatched computer expert.
 Magik (Illyana Rasputin), sister of the Russian X-Man Colossus and long-time resident of the X-Mansion, an accomplished mystic who could open "teleportation discs" allowing travel to Limbo and from there, any point on Earth.
 Magma (Amara Juliana Olivians Aquilla), a fiercely tempered native of a secret Roman society in the Amazon who can control lava.
 Warlock, an extraterrestrial of the techno-organic race known as the Technarchy. Considered a pariah due to the uncommon trait of empathy.

A supplementary New Mutants Annual series began in 1984. These annuals were always written by whoever was the regular New Mutants writer at the time and often included significant changes to the status quo. These changes were not explained in the parent series, so that readers would have to buy New Mutants Annual in order to follow events in both series. The 1985 annual was solicited as New Mutants Annual #2, but published as New Mutants Special Edition #1 because it exceeded the maximum page count for an annual.

In 1986, Professor X was written out of the series. Before he left, he made the X-Men's one-time nemesis, Magneto, headmaster of his school. Magneto would be the team's longest-running headmaster, holding the position from New Mutants #35 through to #75. Fiercely overprotective of his students, particularly after the events of the "Mutant Massacre" and "Fall of the Mutants", he was increasingly used as an uptight foil for the adventurous New Mutants, setting rules that they would inevitably break in the interests of helping their friends.

With Claremont taking on Wolverine and Excalibur, he left The New Mutants and the series was turned over to writer Louise Simonson and illustrator Bret Blevins with issue #55 (Sept. 1987). Simonson was intended to be only a fill-in writer for the six months Claremont needed to get the two new series launched, but he ultimately remained with his new projects, and Simonson ended up writing the series for over three years. During her run, Magma is written out of the book, and Magik is de-aged back to childhood. Due to his unpopularity with New Mutants readers and artists, Cypher is killed off in The New Mutants #60 (February 1988). Simonson recalled, "He wasn't fun to draw. He just stood around and hid behind a tree during a fight... Every artist who ever did him said 'Can't we kill this guy?' We would get letters from fans about how much they hated him." Simonson also folded the X-Terminators, a group of young wards from X-Factor, into the New Mutants.

The X-Terminators added to the team were:

 Boom-Boom (Tabitha Smith), a teen runaway who could create "plasma bombs."
 Firefist (Rusty Collins), a pyrokinetic wanted by the U.S. government.
 Rictor (Julio Richter), a young Mexican who could create shock waves.
 Skids (Sally Blevins), a former Morlock who could project a frictionless force field around her body.

In 1989, Simonson crafted a saga in which the team journeyed to Asgard, the home of the gods of Norse mythology. The storyline wrote Dani Moonstar out of the series, as she joined the Norse pantheon as one of the Valkyrior. However, the most controversial issue of her run was New Mutants #64. Titled "Instant Replay!", the story deals with the New Mutants' mourning for Cypher, and includes a scene in which Warlock attempts to resurrect Cypher by taking his corpse out of its coffin and showing it to Cypher's loved ones. Simonson holds it to be her favorite New Mutants story, though she acknowledges that many readers found it too morbid.

Sales of the series had slumped for several years, but took a sharp upturn after Rob Liefeld took over the penciling and co-plotting chores at the end of 1989. A new mentor for the group, the mysterious mercenary Cable, was introduced, further helping sales. Over the next year, several longtime team members were written out or killed off. However, the relationship between Liefeld and Simonson was fraught with tension, and Simonson claims that editor Bob Harras dealt with the situation by rewriting her plots and dialogue so that the characterizations did not make sense: "Although I wasn't being fired, I think I was being shoved out the door with both hands by Bob Harras. Bob was only doing what he had to do, I expect, which was make Rob Liefeld happy." Simonson eventually gave in, leaving after issue #97. When Liefeld and Fabian Nicieza, who wrote dialogue based on Liefeld's plots, took over as writers of the final three issues of the series, they included several harder-edged characters:

 "Domino" (Vanessa Geraldine Carlysle), Cable's pale-skinned, black-garbed mercenary lover. Actually Copycat, impersonating Domino.
 Feral (Maria Callasantos), who possessed a bestial temperament and appearance.
 Shatterstar (Gaveedra Seven), a swashbuckling warrior from another dimension.
 Warpath (James Proudstar), the younger brother of slain X-Man Thunderbird and a former Hellion, an Apache who possessed super strength and speed.

The New Mutants was cancelled in 1991 with issue #100, but the new platoon-like team formed by Cable continued in X-Force, a successful series (whose first issue sold approximately five million copies) that would continue until 2002, and feature a variety of the former New Mutants cast.

New X-Men: Academy X 

The second incarnation of the New Mutants debuted in 2003 with an ongoing series of the same name, written by Nunzio DeFilippis and Christina Weir. The series would continue for 13 issues, until June 2004, before being relaunched as New X-Men: Academy X in July 2004, with a new #1.

The series featured a handful of the dozens of mutant teenagers attending the Xavier Institute, as well as their instructors, which included various X-Men as well as former members of the original New Mutants (Karma, Magma, Dani Moonstar, and Wolfsbane).

The featured group of students never refer to themselves as "the New Mutants" before the series relaunch as New X-Men: Academy X in 2004, and the reorganization of the Xavier Institute student body into various training squads. The New Mutants, advised by Dani Moonstar, were:

 Elixir (Josh Foley) – Josh is an Omega-Level mutant who can manipulate his or others' biologies to heal or harm. In addition, Elixir possesses gold skin which converts to black when he uses his powers offensively. He was one of the 27 students at the Xavier Institute to retain his powers after "M-Day".  He was seemingly killed by the Dark Riders before returning with vastly enhanced abilities.  He is currently taking refuge in Tibet with Xorn.
 Icarus (Joshua "Jay" Guthrie) – Jay possesses red angelic wings on his back that allow him to fly and which grant him an accelerated healing process. Furthermore, he possesses the ability to manipulate his own voice. He was one of the 27 students at the Xavier Institute to retain his powers after "M-Day". Jay's wings are amputated by Stryker, who later kills him.
 Prodigy (David Alleyne) – David was the team's co-leader who could temporarily gain the knowledge and skills of those near him. Although he was de-powered after "M-Day", he has retained all the knowledge he had acquired prior to the "Decimation". Current member of the Young Avengers.
 Surge (Noriko Ashida) – Noriko is Japanese. She absorbs electricity from her environment which she can discharge as powerful electric blasts or utilize as superhuman speed. She requires mechanical gauntlets to prevent overcharge. Surge was one of the 27 students at the Xavier Institute to retain her powers after "M-Day". She is currently a student of the Jean Grey School for Higher Learning.
 Wallflower (Laurie Collins) – Laurie is a shy girl who generates highly potent pheromones that influence people's emotions. She was one of the 27 students at the Xavier Institute to retain her powers after "M-Day". Laurie was later killed by one of Stryker's men.
 Wind Dancer (Sofia Mantega) – Sofia was the other co-leader and was a temperamental aerokinetic who was particularly adept at using this power to manipulate sound. She was depowered after "M-Day" and joined a group of fellow ex-mutants as part of the New Warriors.  Donning a variety of mechanical gear, she took up the codename Renascence before the group disbanded.  Her current whereabouts are unknown.
 Wither (Kevin Ford) – Kevin could cause organic material to decay with his touch. He eventually switches to the Hellions squad. He is later killed by Elixir.

Another such group, advised by Emma Frost, was known as the Hellions and, like their predecessor, was the arch-rival of the New Mutants. Whereas the original New Mutants series revolved around battles with world-threatening menaces, New Mutants volume 2 focused on the characters' personal relationships and struggles with controlling their powers.

After "M-Day", the cataclysmic event that decimated the world's mutant population, only 27 of the 182 students enrolled at the Xavier Institute retained their powers. The New Mutants and the other training squads were disbanded, and the remaining students were folded into a single junior team, the New X-Men.

Original team reunion 

In May 2009, a third volume of New Mutants was launched. The series was initially written by Zeb Wells and pencilled by Diogenes Neves with the titular characters forming a new field team for the X-Men. The team is a reunion of the cast from the first volume, consisting of Cannonball, Karma, Magik, Magma, Dani Moonstar and  Sunspot.

The reunion is spun from events from the limited series X-Infernus. Magik shows up at the X-Men headquarters in San Francisco, claiming to be from the future and warning that Dani Moonstar and Karma are in danger. Once tests show that Illyanna is not an imposter, Cannonball leads a rescue mission with her. They are joined by Magma and Sunspot. They end up taking on Legion.

In later issue, Warlock returns to Earth and Cypher reappears alive, under the control of Selene. After Warlock frees him from Selene's control, Cypher joins the team.

During "Siege", Hela empowers Dani (now going by the codename Mirage) as a Valkyrie to bring the souls of the fallen Asgardians to her. During "X-Men: Second Coming", Karma loses her leg after being repeatedly stabbed by Cameron Hodge. It is replaced with a bionic one.

Magik leads the team to Limbo, as part of her plan for revenge against the Elder Gods. Cyclops has her imprisoned for her actions. In the same issue, Cannonball and Karma also leave the team.

After they successfully rescue him from Sugar Man, Nate Grey joins the team.

When the X-Men split in X-Men: Schism, the team sides with Cyclops and stays on Utopia. Their next mission is to find Blink. After locating her and helping her defeat a mutant rock band (Diskhord), Blink returns with them but decides to join the X-Men at the Jean Grey School of Higher Learning. She does join them during the last issues of the series.

Krakoan era

New Mutants was relaunched in November 2019 as part of Dawn of X. Written by Jonathan Hickman and Ed Brisson, and drawn by Rod Reis, the initial team consisted of Chamber, Cypher, Karma, Magik, Mirage, Mondo, Sunspot and Wolfsbane. A second team comprising Armor, Boom Boom, Glob, Maxime and Manon debuted in issue #3 (December 2019).

Vita Ayala took over the title December 2020, featuring older New Mutants Karma, Magik, Mirage, Warlock, Warpath, and Wolfsbane acting as teachers and mentors to a new group of younger students known as the Lost Club. This new group of students (which includes Anole, Scout, Rain Boy, Cosmar, and No-Girl) falls under the influence of, and later into conflict with the Shadow King, culminating in an adventure through the astral plane.

Volume 4 issues

Team roster 

In 1982, the original New Mutants team debuted in  Marvel Graphic Novel #4. Originally led by Professor X, and later by Magneto, the lineup gradually expanded to include additional recruits, with subsequent volumes and titles have features a variety of team members and associated characters.

Other versions

Rahne of Terra 
The graphic novel Rahne of Terra, by Peter David, is set in a heroic fantasy universe in which Wolfsbane's counterpart is Princess Rain of Geshem. Other denizens of Terra include Rain's lady-in-waiting Tabby (Boom-Boom), the knights Richard (Rictor),  Robert (Sunspot), and Samuel (Cannonball) and the peasant boy Douglas (Cypher). The Terrans all duplicate the powers of their counterparts in one way or another.

New Mutants: Truth or Death 
In 1997, a three-issue reunion series written by Ben Raab and illustrated by Bernard Chang, New Mutants: Truth or Death, featured the young New Mutants traveling forward in time to meet their older, jaded selves in X-Force.

Worst X-Man Ever
Here the New Mutants consist of X-Ceptional, who can explode permanently, Riches, who turns whatever he touches to gold, Minerva, who can manipulate reality, and Riches' sister Rags. Riches kills Professor X and takes over the world. Rags begins a relationship with Gambit, and Minerva goes to pure idea. X-Ceptional grabs Riches and explodes, killing them both.

Ultimate Marvel 
In Ultimate X-Men, the Academy of Tomorrow (previously called New Mutants) is founded by Emma Frost. It is loosely linked to the X-Men via Emma Frost's professional relationship with her former lover and teacher Charles Xavier. This Academy accepts any talented students, regardless of their genetic status. The team is headed by a non-telepathic and more pacifistic version of Emma Frost and headed by field leader Havok. During Ultimatum, the Academy of Tomorrow is destroyed in a terrorist attack by Multiple Man. Former members include Angel, Beast, Cannonball, Dazzler, Karma, Northstar, Polaris, Sunspot and non-mutant Cypher.

Collected editions

Volume 1
The New Mutants has been reprinted in several trade paperbacks, some containing specific story arcs (such as the "Demon Bear Saga" by Claremont and Sienkiewicz), and some collected as part of a larger crossover of the various X-titles. Only in 2006, however, did a chronological reprinting of the series begin, with the commencement of The New Mutants Classic series of trade paperbacks.

Volume 2

Volume 3

Volume 4

In other media 
 The New Mutants appear in X-Men: Evolution, consisting of Boom-Boom, Cannonball, Magma, Sunspot, Wolfsbane, Berzerker, Iceman, Jubilee, and Multiple. Like their original comic book counterparts, this version of the group are the X-Men's junior team who live at the Xavier Institute.
 A self-titled film adaptation of the New Mutants was released on August 28, 2020. The film was directed by Josh Boone, with a script written by Boone and Knate Gwaltney, and stars Maisie Williams as Rahne Sinclair / Wolfsbane, Anya Taylor-Joy as Illyana Rasputin / Magik, Charlie Heaton as Sam Guthrie / Cannonball, Blu Hunt as Dani Moonstar / Mirage, and Henry Zaga as Bobby da Costa / Sunspot.

References

External links 
 MDP: New Mutants at the Marvel Database Project
 New Mutants at Don Markstein's Toonopedia. Archived from the original on March 28, 2016.
 X-Men Diaries article on the original Hellions and New Mutants
 X-Men comics at Marvel.com
 Academic Podcast Analyzing New Mutants at ComicsVerse.com

 
Comics by Chris Claremont
Comics by Louise Simonson
X-Men titles
1982 comics debuts
Comics characters introduced in 1982
X-Men supporting characters
Marvel Comics superhero teams
Marvel Comics adapted into films